Mathai is a given name or surname, and may refer to:

 Mathai (singer) (Sharon Mathai, born 1992), a contestant on season two of American TV series The Voice
 John Mathai, economist who served as India's first Railway Minister and subsequently as India's Finance Minister
 Mathai Joseph, Indian computer scientist
 Mathai Manjooran, Indian freedom fighter from Kerala
 Mathai Varghese, mathematician and an Australian Research Council Senior Research Fellow at the University of Adelaide
 M.O. Mathai, Special assistant of the Prime Minister of India Jawaharlal Nehru
 Wanjira Mathai (born 1971), Kenyan environmentalist

See also
 Matthew (name)

Indian surnames
Given names